SAH riboswitches are a kind of riboswitch that bind S-adenosylhomocysteine (SAH).  When the coenzyme S-adenosylmethionine (SAM) is used in a methylation reaction, SAH is produced.  SAH riboswitches typically up-regulate genes involved in recycling SAH to create more SAM (or the metabolically related methionine).  This is particularly relevant to cells, because high levels of SAH can be toxic.  Originally identified by bioinformatics, SAH riboswitches are apparent in many species of bacteria, predominantly certain Pseudomonadota and Actinomycetota.  The atomic-resolution 3-dimensional structure of an SAH riboswitch has been solved using X-ray crystallography.

References

External links
 

Cis-regulatory RNA elements
Riboswitch